Riggs is an unincorporated community in Boone County, in the U.S. state of Missouri. Today the community is centered around Riggs Union Church. A small store and several homes formerly stood at the intersection of Old Number 7 and Williams Road. The Mount Carmel (Sims) Cemetery is nearby.

History
A post office called Riggs was established in 1889, and remained in operation until 1907. The community was named after Shelton Riggs, a local merchant whose store also contained the post office.

References

Unincorporated communities in Boone County, Missouri
Unincorporated communities in Missouri